William Arthur Martin (1938-1981) was a computer scientist from Oklahoma City, Oklahoma.

After graduating from Northwest Classen High School, where he was a state wrestling champion, he attended MIT where he received a bachelor's degree (1960), master's (1962) and a Ph.D. (1967) in electrical engineering under supervision of Marvin Minsky with a dissertation on "Symbolic Mathematical Laboratory". While obtaining those degrees, he worked as a teaching assistant at MIT (beginning in 1960).  He became an assistant professor in 1968 and was promoted to associate professor of electrical engineering in 1972. In 1975, he received academic tenure.  He held a joint appointment at the MIT Sloan School of Management.

His research pulled him towards the Project MAC, which became the Laboratory for Computer Science and the Artificial Intelligence Laboratory, where he researched expert systems.

After finishing a Ph.D. dissertation on symbolic mathematics, Martin co-founded the Macsyma project in 1968 and directed it until 1971.  Macsyma later became a successful commercial product and is also the core of the free Maxima system.

Martin then worked in automatic programming, knowledge representation and  natural language processing.

Bibliography

External links
Obituary from Tech Talk

References 

1981 deaths
1938 births
People from Oklahoma City
American computer scientists
MIT Sloan School of Management faculty
Lisp (programming language) people
Natural language processing researchers
Computational linguistics researchers